The French School of Detroit (FSD) is a French school with its administrative offices in West Maple Middle School, in Bloomfield Township, Oakland County, Michigan in Metro Detroit; this facility has a Bloomfield Hills, Michigan mailing address.

The French School of Detroit serves preschool through high school. FSD students reside in the Birmingham Public School District.

Locations

History

The French School of Detroit was created in September 1986, pursuing the trend of French language education in Metro Detroit started by the "Lycée International School". The Lycée International School, opened in Southfield in 1981 after Renault moved 50 employees to Metro Detroit, because Renault purchased a stake in American Motors Company. In 1983 the Lycée International School had 130 students, with the majority being Americans, 30 being children of Renault employees, and 25 being children of French parents including diplomats.

See also
 American School of Paris - An American international school in France

References

External links
 

French-American culture in Michigan
High schools in Oakland County, Michigan
Schools in Oakland County, Michigan
French international schools in the United States
Educational institutions established in 1968
1968 establishments in Michigan